Ekwanok Country Club is a golf course in Manchester, Vermont.  It was built by Walter Travis.

Early history 

Ekwanok is among Walter Travis' best-known works.  The Ekwanok Country Club is very "old school," and it was Travis's first involvement in golf course architecture. Today, it is recognized as the finest course in the Green Mountain State by Golf Digest. 

Ekwanok was one of the longest courses in the country when it opened in 1899, at a mere 6,082 yards.

In 1914, Francis Ouimet won the United States Amateur Championship, defeating Jerry Travers 6 & 5 in the 36-hole final. After that US Amateur Championship, Ekwanok Country Club, of its own volition, quietly withdrew from the national golf scene.

Restoration 
Since 2011, the Ekwanok Club has begun a restoration of the course's original bunkers and greens, some that had been lost or modified over the years. Bruce Hepner of Renaissance Designs was hired to complete these changes.

Ekwanok's restoration followed many of the original principles of Walter Travis. Ekwanok preserved the unique Travis features and history of the course for the enjoyment of future generations.

Seventh hole 
The most famous hole is the seventh hole, which is a par 5 playing 595 yards. It is an extremely long hole considering the time that it was built and "Travis worked with the land and the result is a uniquely memorable hole with a hill that bisects the fairway from the 300 to 370 yard mark."

References

External links 
 

Golf clubs and courses in Vermont
Manchester, Vermont
1899 establishments in Vermont